Lyapino is a rural locality (a khutor) in Yevdakovskoye Rural Settlement, Kamensky District, Voronezh Oblast, Russia. The population was 64 as of 2010. There are 2 streets.

Geography 
Lyapino is located 8 km north of Kamenka (the district's administrative centre) by road. Yevdakovo is the nearest rural locality.

References 

Rural localities in Kamensky District, Voronezh Oblast